Events from the year 1610 in art.

Events
Caravaggio begins his journey from Naples home to Rome, where he is to receive a pardon from the Pope through the intercession of Cardinal Scipione Borghese; however, Caravaggio never arrives in Rome.
Stained glass windows installed in the chapel of Hatfield House are the first in the country since the start of the English Reformation.

Works

Sofonisba Anguissola - Self-portrait
Caravaggio
The Denial of Saint Peter
John the Baptist (Galleria Borghese, Rome)
The Martyrdom of Saint Ursula
David with the Head of Goliath (1609-1610)
Domenichino - Adoration of the Shepherds (c.1607-1610)
Artemisia Gentileschi - Susanna and the Elders
Orazio Gentileschi
David After the death of Goliath (approximate date)
Madonna with Child
Peter Paul Rubens - Samson and Delilah (approximate date)

Births
May 18 – Stefano della Bella, Italian printmaker known for etchings of many subjects, including military ones (died 1664)
September 4 - Giovanni Andrea Sirani, Bolognese painter of the Baroque period (died 1670)
December 10 – Adriaen van Ostade, Dutch genre painter (died 1685)
December 15 – David Teniers the Younger, Flemish painter (died 1690)
date unknown
Hong Ren, Chinese monk and painter of the Xin'an school of painting (died 1664)
Francesco Lauri, Italian fresco painter (died 1635)
Li Yin, Chinese painter, poet and calligrapher (died 1685)
Anton Francesco Lucini, Italian engraver and printmaker (died after 1661)
Jan Miense Molenaer, Dutch genre painter (died 1668)
Giulio Quaglio, Italian fresco painter (died 1658)
Giovanni Francesco Romanelli, Italian fresco painter (died 1662)
probable
Jan Asselijn, Dutch painter of landscapes and animals (died 1652)
Domenico de Benedettis, Italian painter (died 1678)
Jan Dirksz Both, Dutch painter (died 1652)
Francisco Camilo, Spanish painter (died 1671)
Albert Eckhout, Dutch portrait and still life painter (died 1665)
Anthonie de Lorme, Dutch painter (died 1673)
Simon Luttichuys, Dutch painter (died 1661)
Jean Nicolle, French painter (died 1650)
Michele Pace del Campidoglio, Italian painter of fruit and flowers (died 1670)
Adriano Palladino, Italian painter born and active in Cortona (died 1680)
Giovanni Battista Passeri, Italian painter of genre and still life paintings (died 1679)
Dirck van Santvoort, Dutch painter (died 1680)
Karel Škréta, Czech Baroque painter (died 1674)
Hendrik Martenszoon Sorgh, Dutch painter (died 1670)
Pieter Verbeeck, Dutch painter (died 1679)
Jacob Willemszoon de Wet, Dutch painter (died 1675-1691)

Deaths
January 5 - Hieronymus Francken I, Flemish painter (born 1540)
March 19 - Hasegawa Tōhaku, Japanese painter and founder of the Hasegawa school of Japanese painting during the Azuchi-Momoyama period (born 1539)
July 18 – Caravaggio, Italian painter (born 1571)
October 26 - Francesco Vanni, Italian mannerist painter (born 1563)
December 11 – Adam Elsheimer, German "cabinet" painter (born 1578)
date unknown
Sadiqi Beg, Persian writer and miniaturist (born 1533)
Nicolás Borrás, Spanish painter (born 1530)
Francesco Curia, Italian Renaissance painter (born 1538)
Benedetto Gennari, Italian painter (born 1563)
probable
Giovanni Battista Cremonini, Italian painter of primarily frescoes (born 1550)
Juan Bautista Vázquez the Younger, Spanish sculptor part of the Sevillian school of sculpture (born unknown)

References

 
Years of the 17th century in art
1610s in art